Monro is a surname, and may refer to:

In science and education 
 Alexander Monro (primus), the founder of Edinburgh Medical School
 Alexander Monro (secundus), Scottish anatomist, physician and medical educator
 Alexander Monro (tertius) (1773–1859), Scottish medical pioneer and educator, also known as Alexander Monro III
 David Binning Monro, Scottish Homeric scholar
 John U. Monro (1912-2002), American academic administrator

In politics 
 Cecil Monro, Australian politician
 Charles Carmichael Monro (1860–1929), Governor of Gibraltar
 David Monro, New Zealand politician
 Hector Monro, Baron Monro of Langholm, Conservative & Unionist Party politician

In music 
 Matt Monro, English ballad singer of the 1960s and one of great international postwar entertainers
 Ryan Monro, band member in The Cat Empire
 Alison Monro, alternative name of Alison Sudol, before forming A Fine Frenzy

In other fields 
 Ander Monro, Canadian rugby player
 Donald Monro (disambiguation)
 George Monro (disambiguation)
 Harold Monro, British poet
 Heather Monro, the second British female orienteer to win a world championship medal
 James Monro, the first Assistant Commissioner of the London Metropolitan Police
 Joanna Monro, British actress
 Stuart Monro, prominent Scottish geologist and science communicator
 Monro family, a family of noted physicians of London, predominantly associated with Bedlam and various medical societies

See also 
 Monroe (disambiguation)
 Munro (disambiguation)
 Munroe (disambiguation)
 Foramina of Monro, the channel that connects the lateral ventricles with the third ventricle of the brain
 Monro Muffler Brake, an automotive service center with over 700 stores